The Providence Grays finished the 1881 season in second place in the National League for a second straight season. However, management strife and sagging attendance hurt the team's bottom line and they occasionally had trouble meeting payroll.

Regular season

Season standings

Record vs. opponents

Roster

Player stats

Batting

Starters by position
Note: Pos = Position; G = Games played; AB = At bats; H = Hits; Avg. = Batting average; HR = Home runs; RBI = Runs batted in

Other batters
Note: G = Games played; AB = At bats; H = Hits; Avg. = Batting average; HR = Home runs; RBI = Runs batted in

Pitching

Starting pitchers
Note: G = Games pitched; IP = Innings pitched; W = Wins; L = Losses; ERA = Earned run average; SO = Strikeouts

Notes

References
1881 Providence Grays season at Baseball Reference

Providence Grays seasons
Providence Grays season
Providence